Sergi Bruguera defeated the two-time defending champion Jim Courier in the final, 6–4, 2–6, 6–2, 3–6, 6–3 to win the men's singles tennis title at the 1993 French Open.

This was the first Grand Slam of future world No. 1, two-time major champion and 2000 Olympic gold medalist Yevgeny Kafelnikov in the tournament as a qualifier, he lost to Sláva Doseděl in the second round.

Seeds
The seeded players are listed below. Sergi Bruguera is the champion; others show the round in which they were eliminated.

  Pete Sampras (quarterfinals)
  Jim Courier (finals)
  Stefan Edberg (quarterfinals)
  Boris Becker (second round)
  Goran Ivanišević (third round)
  Petr Korda (second round)
  Ivan Lendl (first round)
  Michael Chang (second round)
  Michael Stich (fourth round)
  Sergi Bruguera (champion)
  Andrei Medvedev (semifinals)
  Richard Krajicek (semifinals)
  Karel Nováček (quarterfinals)
  Wayne Ferreira (second round)
  Thomas Muster (fourth round)
  MaliVai Washington (fourth round)

Qualifying

Draw

Finals

Top half

Section 1

Section 2

Section 3

Section 4

Bottom half

Section 5

Section 6

Section 7

Section 8

References

External links
 Association of Tennis Professionals (ATP) – 1993 French Open Men's Singles draw
1993 French Open – Men's draws and results at the International Tennis Federation

Men's Singles
French Open by year – Men's singles
1993 ATP Tour